Laurent Lefrançois (born in 1974 in Caen) is a French composer.

Life 
Winner of the Claude Arrieu Prize of the Sacem in 2016 and public prize at the international competition for young composers in Boulogne in 2006 (with Philippe Hersant as president of the jury), Lefrançois graduated from the École normale de musique de Paris in orchestration and musical composition in Michel Merlet's class. He studied harmony and counterpoint with Stéphane Delplace and composition with Guillaume Connesson.

Works 
 Sextuor, commission from Radio France for the Festival Présences 2004
 Erinnerung, sextet for string instruments, commission from Proquartet
 Padouk Phantasticus for strings, commission from the Festival international de musique de Salon-de-Provence, 2009.

Discography 
 Balnéaire Chamber Music, monography, label Evidence, 2014.

References

External links 
 Personal website
 Œuvres de chambre de Laurent Lefrançois (ResMusica)
 Lefrançois on France Musique
 Laurent Lefrançois - Padouk Phantasticus (YouTube)

1974 births
Living people
Musicians from Caen
French classical composers
French male classical composers
French radio producers
École Normale de Musique de Paris alumni
21st-century French musicians
21st-century French male musicians